{{Infobox Hindu leader
| honorific-prefix   = Srila
| name           = Raghunatha Dasa  রঘুনাথ দাস গোস্বামী
| honorific-suffix   = Goswami
| image          = Sri Srimad Raghunatha Dasa Goswami.jpg
| caption        = Raghunatha dasa Goswami
| birth_date     = 1494
| religion           = Hinduism
| birth_place    = Krishnapur, Hooghly District of present-day West Bengal<ref name = "Bose439">Sengupta, Subodh Chandra and Bose, Anjali (editors), (1976), Samsad Bangali Charitabhidhan (Biographical dictionary), p  439</ref>
| death_date     = 1586
| death_place    = 
| occupation     = 
| nationality    = Indian
| denomination       = Vaishnavism
| spouse             = 
| lineage            = Brahma-Madhva-Gaudiya
| sect               = Gaudiya Vaishnavism
| subsect            = 
| known_for          = Codifying Gaudiya Vaishnavism
| notable_works      = 
| relatives          =  
| signature          = 
| institute          = 
| founder            = 
| philosophy         = Achintya Bheda Abheda
| guru               = Nityananda
| location           = Vrindavan, India
| predecessor        = 
| successor          = 
| disciples          = 
| influenced         = 
| initiation         = 
| initiation_date    = 
| initiation_place   = 
| initiator          = 
| ordination         = 
| website            = 
| honors             = Six Goswamis of Vrindavana
}}
 

Raghunatha dasa Goswami (1494–1586),  Dasa Goswami, was a disciples of the Śrī Yadunandan-ācārya (see Vilāpa Kusumānjali, verse 4, Caitanya-Caritāmṛta Ādi chapter 12 and Antya 6) one of the apostle of the Vaishnava saint, Chaitanya Mahaprabhu, the primary six of which were collectively known as the Six Goswamis of Vrindavan. Together the Six Goswamis established the philosophical writings and records which became the theological basis of the Gaudiya Vaishnava tradition. Among the six, Raghunatha dasa was renowned for his qualities of simplicity and renunciation.

Background
Born as the son of a wealthy landowner Govardhana Dasa from Saptagram in Hooghly District of present-day West Bengal, Raghunatha dasa is said to have showed a particular disinterest in everyday pleasures and an interest in more religious pursuits from a relatively young age. This was much to the displeasure of his parents, who eventually took to hiring guards in order to prevent Raghunatha dasa from leaving the family home with the aim of having a spiritual life. Eventually Raghunatha dasa escaped their home and made a journey to Jagannath Puri where he met his guru, Chaitanya Mahaprabhu.

Panihati Chuda Dahi Festival
A major event that Raghunath Das Goswami organized was the Chuda-Dahi festival at Panihati. 
Raghunath was visiting Panihati to meet Lord Nitai, who is incarnation of Baladeva, and his associates. Nitai requested him to feed chuda-dahi (curd mixed with chipped rice) to all the devotees who were present there. Raghunath arranged for the ingredients from the neighboring villages, and helped by his associates, prepared two kinds of chuda-dahi. One contained chipped rice mixed with curd, sugar and bananas; the other contained chipped rice mixed with condensed milk, sugar, ghee, and edible camphor.

Then the preparations were served out, and everybody enjoyed it.

Regulated lifestyle
According to accounts in the Chaitanya Charitamrta, written by Krishnadasa Kaviraja Goswami, Raghunatha dasa led a life of extreme devotional practice, spending more than twenty-two hours out of every twenty-four chanting the Hare Krishna Maha mantra, and eating and sleeping for less than an hour and a half per day, and on some days that also was reduced. His clothes included a simple torn cloth and a patchwork scarf.

In this connection Raghunatha dasa is quoted to have said:"If one's heart has been cleansed by perfect knowledge and one has understood Krishna, the Supreme Brahman, he then gains everything. Why should such a person act like a debauchee by trying very carefully to maintain his material body?"Raghunatha Dasa Goswami served Chaitanya mahaprabhu for sixteen years at Jagannatha Puri. Afte which he went to Vrindavan in c.1543-44, where he lived for many years at a sacred lake known as Radha-kunda''. His bhajana-kutir, or place of worship, still exists there and is visited by many pilgrims to this day.

Main works

See also
Bhakti Yoga
Hare Krishna (mantra)
Nityananda
Gaudiya Math
International Society for Krishna Consciousness
Krishnology

References

External links
 Raghunatha dasa Goswami (radhakunda.com)
 Raghunatha Das gosai - The Gaudiya Treasures of Bengal

Bengali Hindus
Bengali Hindu saints
16th-century Bengalis
People from Hooghly district
16th-century Hindu religious leaders
Gaudiya religious leaders
People from Mathura
Scholars from West Bengal